Stöttingfjället is a highland in Swedish Lapland. Geologically, the southeastern portion of Stöttingsfjället is interpreted as being a part of the Sub-Cambrian peneplain that have been uplifted by faults.

References

Plateaus of Sweden
Norrland